Walstein Childs House is a historic home located at Wallkill in Ulster County, New York.  It is a -story, five-bay rectangular shaped stone dwelling constructed about 1763.

It was listed on the National Register of Historic Places in 2003.

References

Houses on the National Register of Historic Places in New York (state)
Houses completed in 1763
Houses in Ulster County, New York
National Register of Historic Places in Ulster County, New York